The Decembrist Revolt took place in Russia on , following the sudden death of Emperor Alexander I.

Alexander's heir-presumptive,  Konstantin, had privately declined the succession, unknown to the court, and his younger brother Nicholas ascended the throne as Emperor Nicholas I. While some of the army had sworn loyalty to Nicholas, a force of about 3,000 troops tried to mount a military coup in favour of Konstantin. The rebels, although weakened by dissension between their leaders, confronted the loyalists outside the Senate building in the presence of a large crowd. In the confusion, the Emperor's envoy, Mikhail Miloradovich, was assassinated. Eventually, the loyalists opened fire with heavy artillery, which scattered the rebels. Many were sentenced to hanging, prison, or exile to Siberia. The conspirators became known as the Decembrists.

Union of Salvation and Union of Prosperity
At first, many officers were encouraged by Tsar Alexander I's early liberal reformation of Russian society and politics. Liberalism was encouraged on an official level, creating high expectations during the period of rapprochement between Napoleon and Alexander. The major advocate for reform in Alexander's regime was Count Mikhail Mikhailovich Speransky. During his early years in the regime, Speransky helped inspire the organization of the Ministry of the Interior, the reform of ecclesiastic education, and strengthening the government's role in the country's economic development. Speransky's role increased greatly in 1808. From then until 1812, when they feared him as a liberal similar to Napoleon and his invasion, Speransky developed plans for the reorganization of Russia's government. Because of increasing hostility, he was forced to flee into exile.

Returning from exile in 1819, Speransky was appointed as the governor of Siberia, with the task of reforming local government. In 1818, the tsar asked Count Nikolay Nikolayevich Novosiltsev to draw up a constitution. The abolition of serfdom in the Baltic provinces was instituted between 1816 and 1819. However, internal and external unrest, which the tsar believed stemmed from political liberalization, led to a series of repressions and a return to a former government of restraint and conservatism.

Meanwhile, the experiences of the Napoleonic Wars and realization of the suffering of peasant soldiers resulted in Decembrist officers and sympathizers being attracted to reform changes in society. They displayed their contempt of court by rejecting the court lifestyle, wearing their cavalry swords at balls (to indicate their unwillingness to dance), and committing themselves to academic study. These new practices captured the spirit of the times as a willingness by the Decembrists to embrace both the peasant (i.e., the fundamental Russian people) and ongoing reform movements from intellectuals abroad.

Pavel Pestel identified reasons for reform:

Historians have noted that the United States Declaration of Independence and the American Revolution may also have influenced Decembrists, as they did other nations. The constitution written by Nikita Muravyov was highly similar to the United States Constitution. But the Decembrists were against slavery in the United States. They worked to free any slaves and serfs from all countries in Russia immediately. Pestel and his followers opposed the United States' federal model in peaceful times as threatening to the would-be Russian/United Slavic federation; they only approved the US revolutionary model. While agreeing with Pestel that the American revolutionary model could be the best form for Russia, the Polish patriotic society would not agree to participate in establishing a federation. They wanted a United States-style republic or other state, with Lithuania, Belarus and Ukraine to be included in a unitary Poland (i.e., more or less the territory of the former Polish–Lithuanian Commonwealth), without any Russian involvement in the affairs of these territories.

In 1816, several officers of the Imperial Russian Guard founded a society known as the Union of Salvation, or of the Faithful and True Sons of the Fatherland. The society acquired a revolutionary cast after it was joined by the idealistic Pavel Pestel. The charter was similar to charters of the organizations of carbonari. Pestel was supported by Yakushkin when there were rumors that the emperor had intended to transfer the capital from Saint Petersburg to Warsaw, and to liberate all peasants without the consent of Russian landlords. They would not be able to influence a government based in Warsaw. Yakushkin intended to kill the emperor even before the revolution. When the society consisting of Russian landlords had refused to kill the emperor based on such rumors,  Yakushkin left the society. The more liberal Mikhail Muravyov-Vilensky created a new charter similar to that of Tugendbund. It did not have revolutionary plans and the society was called the Union of Prosperity. It was still considered illegal and similar to masonic lodges. (The small Order of Russian knights, excepting its prominent member Alexander von Benckendorff, also joined the Union of Prosperity, together with the members of the Union of Salvation.)

After a mutiny in the Semenovsky Regiment in 1820, the society decided to suspend activity in 1821. Two groups, however, continued to function secretly: a Southern Society, based at Tulchin, a small garrison town in Ukraine, in which Pestel was the outstanding figure, and a Northern Society, based at Saint Petersburg, led by guard officers Nikita Muraviev, Prince S. P. Trubetskoy and Prince Eugene Obolensky. The political aims of the more moderate Northern Society were a British-style constitutional monarchy with a limited franchise. They envisioned that it could be replaced with a republic in the future but only according to the will of the people. They also believed there should be a legislative assembly and did not call for the execution of the imperial family. They supported the abolition of serfdom, according to the interests of Russian landlords, i.e. with land to be retained by landlords, in a style similar to the abolition of serfdom in Baltic provinces. They also supported equality before the law. The Southern Society, under Pestel's influence, was more radical and wanted to abolish the monarchy, establish a republic, similar to the Union of Salvation, and contrary to the Union of Salvation plans, to redistribute land, taking half into state ownership and dividing the rest among the peasants. The Society of United Slavs (also known as the Slavic Union – Pan-Slavism) was established in Novograd-Volynsky in the Ukraine in 1823. Its never-written program was similar to that of the Southern Society but the main emphasis was on the equal federation of Russia (including Ukraine), Poland, Moldavia (including Bessarabia) with the attachment of Wallachia, Transylvania, Hungary (including Slovakia, Slovenia, Vojvodina, the Carpatho-Ukraine aka Zarkarpattia), Croatia, Serbia, Dalmatia, the Czech lands of Bohemia and Moravia, i.e. all Slavic & Vlach countries with the exception of Bulgaria and Macedonia, in the future. This society joined the Southern Society and adopted its program in exchange for the recognition of the Slavic federation zeal by the Southern society in September 1825.

At Senate Square

When Konstantin made his renunciation public, and Nicholas stepped forward to assume the throne, the Northern Society acted. With the capital in temporary confusion, and one oath to Konstantin having already been sworn, the society scrambled in secret meetings to convince regimental leaders not to swear allegiance to Nicholas. These efforts culminated in the Decembrist Revolt. The leaders of the society elected Prince Sergei Trubetskoy as interim ruler.

They expected to be joined by the rest of the troops stationed in Saint Petersburg, but they were disappointed. The revolt was hampered when it was deserted by its supposed leader Prince Trubetskoy. His second-in-command, Colonel Bulatov, also vanished from the scene. After a hurried consultation, the rebels appointed Prince Eugene Obolensky as a replacement leader.

For hours, there was a stand-off between the 3,000 rebels and the 9,000 loyal troops stationed outside the Senate building, with some desultory shooting from the rebel side. A vast crowd of civilian on-lookers began fraternizing with the rebels but did not join the action. Eventually, Nicholas (the new tsar) appeared in person at the square and sent Count Mikhail Miloradovich to parley with the rebels. Miloradovich was fatally shot in the back by Pyotr Kakhovsky while delivering a public address, then stabbed by Yevgeny Obolensky. At the same time, a rebelling squad of grenadiers, led by Lieutenant Nikolay Panov, entered the Winter Palace but failed to seize it and retreated.

After spending most of the day in fruitless attempts to parley with the rebel force, Nicholas ordered a cavalry charge by Her Sovereign Majesty Empress Maria Theodorovna's Chevalier Guard Regiment that slipped on the icy cobbles and retired in disorder. Eventually, at the end of the day, Nicholas ordered three artillery pieces to open fire with grapeshot ammunition to devastating effect. To avoid the slaughter, the rebels broke and ran. Some attempted to regroup on the frozen surface of the river Neva to the north. However, they were targeted by the artillery and suffered many casualties. As the ice was broken by the cannon fire, many sank. The revolt in the north came to an end. There was a rumor that during the nighttime, police and loyal army units were detached to clean the city and the Neva river, as many of the dead, dying, and wounded had been cast into it.

Arrests and trial

While the Northern Society scrambled in the days leading up to the revolt, the Southern Society (based in Tulchin) took a serious blow. The day before, acting on reports of treason, the police arrested Pavel Pestel. It took two weeks for the Southern Society to learn of the events in the capital. Meanwhile, other members of the leadership were arrested. The Southern Society, and a nationalistic group called the United Slavs, discussed revolt. When learning of the location of some of the arrested men, the United Slavs freed them by force. One of the freed men, Sergey Muravyov-Apostol, assumed leadership of the revolt. After converting the soldiers of Vasilkov to the cause, Muraviev-Apostol easily captured the city. The rebelling army was confronted by superior forces that were heavily armed with artillery loaded with grapeshot.

On , the rebels met defeat, and the surviving leaders were sent to Saint Petersburg to stand trial with the northern leaders. The Decembrists were taken to the Winter Palace to be interrogated, tried, and convicted. The murderer Kakhovsky was executed by hanging, together with four other leading Decembrists: Pavel Pestel; the poet Kondraty Ryleyev; Sergey Muravyov-Apostol; and Mikhail Bestuzhev-Ryumin. A further 31 Decembrists facing the death penalty were instead imprisoned. Other Decembrists were exiled to Siberia, Kazakhstan, and the Far East.

Suspicion also fell on several eminent persons who were on friendly terms with the Decembrist leaders and could have been aware of their clandestine organizations, notably Alexander Pushkin, Aleksander Griboyedov, and Aleksey Yermolov.

Decembrists in Siberia
On , the first party of Decembrist convicts began its exodus to Siberia. Among this group were Prince Trubetskoi, Prince Obolensky, Peter and Andrei Borisov, Prince Volkonsky, and Artamon Muraviev, all of them bound for the mines at Nerchinsk. The journey eastward was fraught with hardship, yet for some it offered refreshing changes in scenery and peoples following imprisonment. Decembrist Nikolay Vasil’yevich Basargin was unwell when he set out from Saint Petersburg, but he recovered his strength on the move; his memoirs depict the journey to Siberia in a cheerful light, full of praise for the "common people" and commanding landscapes.

Not all Decembrists could identify with Basargin's positive experience. Because of their lower social standing, "soldier-Decembrists" experienced the emperor's vengeance in full. Sentenced by court-martial, many of these "commoners" received thousands of lashes. Those that survived went to Siberia on foot, chained alongside common criminals.

Fifteen out of 124 Decembrists were convicted of "state-crimes" by the Supreme Criminal Court, and sentenced to "exile-to-settlement". These men were sent directly to isolated locales, such as Berezov, Narym, Surgut, Pelym, Irkutsk, Yakutsk, and Viliuisk, among others. Few Russians inhabited these places: The populations consisted mainly of Siberian aborigines, Tunguses, Yakuts, Tartars, Ostiaks, Mongols, and Buriats.

Of all those exiled, the largest group of prisoners was sent to Chita, Zabaykalsky Krai, transferred three years later to Petrovsky Zavod, near Nerchinsk. This group, sentenced to hard labor, included principal leaders of the Decembrist movement as well as the members of the United Slavs. Siberian Governor-General Lavinsky argued that it was easiest to control a large, concentrated group of convicts, and Emperor Nicholas I pursued this policy in order to maximize surveillance and to limit revolutionaries’ contact with local populations. Concentration facilitated the guarding of prisoners, but it also allowed the Decembrists to continue to exist as a community. This was especially true at Chita. The move to Petrovsky Zavod, however, forced Decembrists to divide into smaller groups; the new location was compartmentalized with an oppressive sense of order. Convicts could no longer congregate casually. Although nothing could destroy the Decembrists’ conception of fraternity, Petrovsky Zavod forced them to live more private lives. Owing to a number of imperial sentence reductions, exiles started to complete their labor terms years ahead of schedule. The labor was of minimal travail; Stanislav Leparsky, commandant of Petrovsky Zavod, failed to enforce Decembrists’ original labor sentences, and criminal convicts carried out much of the work in place of the revolutionaries. Most Decembrists left Petrovsky Zavod between 1835 and 1837, settling in or near Irkutsk, Minusinsk, Kurgan, Tobol’sk, Turinsk, and Yalutorovsk. Those Decembrists who had already lived in or visited Siberia, such as Dimitri Zavalishin, prospered upon leaving Petrovsky Zavod's confines, but most found it physically arduous and more psychologically unnerving than prison life.

The Siberian population met the Decembrists with great hospitality. Natives played central roles in keeping lines of communication open among Decembrists, friends, and relatives. Most merchants and state employees were also sympathetic. To the masses, the Decembrist exiles were "generals who had refused to take the oath to Nicholas I." They were great figures that had suffered political persecution for their loyalty to the people. On the whole, indigenous Siberian populations greatly respected the Decembrists and were extremely hospitable in their reception of them.

Upon arrival at places of settlement, exiles had to comply with extensive regulations under a strict governmental regime. Local police watched, regulated, and notated every move that Decembrists attempted to make. Dimitri Zavalishin was thrown into prison for failing to remove his hat before a lieutenant. Not only were political and social activities carefully monitored and prevented, there was interference regarding religious convictions. Local clergy accused Prince Shakhovskoi of "heresy", due to his interest in natural sciences. Authorities investigated and restrained other Decembrists for not attending church. The regime thoroughly censored all correspondences, especially communication with relatives. Messages were scrupulously reviewed by both officials in Siberia and the Third Division of the political intelligence service at Saint Petersburg. This screening process necessitated dry, careful wording on the part of Decembrists. In the words of Bestuzhev, correspondence bore a "lifeless ... imprint of officiality." Under the settlement regime, allowances were extremely meager. Certain Decembrists, including the Volkonskys, the Murav’yovs, and the Trubetskoys, were rich, but the majority of exiles had no money, and were forced to live off a mere 15 desyatins (about 16 hectares) of land, the allotment granted to each settler. Decembrists, with little to no knowledge of the land, attempted to eke out a living on wretched soil with next to no equipment. Financial aid from relatives and wealthier comrades saved many; others perished.

Despite extensive restrictions, limitations, and hardships, Decembrists believed that they could improve their situation through personal initiative. A constant stream of petitions came out of Petrovsky Zavod addressed to General Leparskii and Emperor Nicholas I. Most of the petitions were written by Decembrists’ wives who had cast aside social privileges and comfort to follow their husbands into exile. These wives joined under the leadership of Princess Mariia Volkonskaia, and by 1832, through relentless petitions, managed to secure for their men formal cancellation of labor requirements, and several privileges, including the right of husbands to live with their wives in privacy. Decembrists managed to gain transfers and allowances through persuasive petitions as well as through the intervention of family members. This process of petitioning, and the resultant concessions made by the tsar and officials, was and would continue to be a standard practice of political exiles in Siberia. The chain of bureaucratic procedures and orders linking Saint Petersburg to Siberian administration was often circumvented or ignored. These breaks in bureaucracy afforded exiles a small capacity for betterment and activism.

Wives of many Decembrists followed their husbands into exile. The expression Decembrist wife is a Russian symbol of the devotion of a wife to her husband. Maria Volkonskaya, the wife of the Decembrist leader Sergei Volkonsky, notably followed her husband to his exile in Irkutsk. Despite the spartan conditions of this banishment, Sergei Volkonsky and his wife Maria took opportunities to celebrate the liberalising mode of their exile. Sergei took to wearing an untrimmed beard (rejecting Peter the Great's reforms and salon fashion), wearing peasant dress and socialising with many of his peasant associates with whom he worked the land at his farm in Urik. Maria, equally, established schools, a foundling hospital and a theater for the local population. Sergei returned after 30 years of his exile had elapsed, though his titles and land remained under royal possession. Other exiles preferred to remain in Siberia after their sentences were served, preferring its relative freedom to the stifling intrigues of Moscow and Saint Petersburg, and after years of exile there was not much for them to return to. Many Decembrists thrived in exile, in time becoming landowners and farmers. In later years, they became idols of the populist movement of the 1860s and the 1870s as the Decembrists' advocacy of reform (including the abolition of serfdom) won them many admirers, including the writer Leo Tolstoy.

During their time in exile, the Decembrists fundamentally influenced Siberian life. Their presence was most definitely felt culturally and economically, political activity being so far removed from the "pulse of national life" so as to be negligible. While in Petrovsky Zavod, Decembrists taught each other foreign languages, arts and crafts, and musical instruments. They established "academies" made up of libraries, schools, and symposia. In their settlements, Decembrists were fierce advocates of education, and founded many schools for natives, the first of which opened at Nerchinsk. Schools were also founded for women, and soon exceeded capacity. Decembrists contributed greatly to the field of agriculture, introducing previously unknown crops such as vegetables, tobacco, rye, buckwheat, and barley, and advanced agricultural methods such as hothouse cultivation. Trained doctors among the political exiles promoted and organized medical aid. The homes of prominent exiles like Prince Sergei Volkonsky and Prince Sergei Trubetskoi became social centers of their locales. All throughout Siberia, the Decembrists sparked an intellectual awakening: literary writings, propaganda, newspapers, and books from European Russia began to circulate the eastern provinces, the local population developing a capacity for critical political observation. The Decembrists even held a certain influence within Siberian administration; Dimitry Zavalishin played a critical role in developing and advocating Russian Far East policy. Although the Decembrists lived in isolation, their scholarly activities encompassed Siberia at large, including its culture, economy, administration, population, geography, botany, and ecology. Despite restricted circumstances, the Decembrists accomplished an extraordinary amount, and their work was deeply appreciated by Siberians.

On 26 August 1856, with the ascent of Alexander II to the throne, the Decembrists received amnesty, and their rights, privileges were restored. Their children obtained rights, privileges and even titles of their fathers (such as princes) even if their fathers' titles were not restored. However, not all chose to return to the West. Some were financially inhibited, others had no family, and many were weak with old age. To many, Siberia had become home. Those that did return to European Russia did so with enthusiasm for the enforcement of the Emancipation Reforms of 1861. The exile of the Decembrists led to the permanent implantation of an intelligentsia in Siberia. For the first time, a cultural, intellectual, and political elite came to Siberian society as permanent residents; they integrated with the country and participated alongside natives in its development.

Assessment
With the failure of the Decembrists, Russia's autocracy would continue for almost a century, although serfdom would be officially abolished in 1861 and the parliaments  in Russia and Finland would be established in 1905. Finland had a parliament since Alexander I, but the number of electors was limited. The Russian Constitution of 1905 was called "The basic laws" as the Decembrists had called it.  Though defeated, the Decembrists did effect some change on the regime.  Their dissatisfaction forced Nicholas I to turn his attention inward to address the issues of the empire. He included many Decembrists who had joined his forces on the Senate Square and did not ultimately support the revolt in spite of their participation in Decembrist meetings into his government (such as Benkendorf, appointed to supervise the human rights, Muraviev-Vilensky and others). In 1826, Speransky was appointed by Nicholas I to head the Second Section of His Imperial Majesty's Own Chancellery, a committee formed to codify Russian law. Under his leadership, the committee produced a publication of the complete collection of laws of the Russian Empire, containing 35,993 enactments.  This codification called the "Full Collection of Laws" (Polnoye Sobraniye Zakonov) was presented to Nicholas I, and formed the basis for the "Collection of Laws of the Russian Empire" (Svod Zakonov Rossiskoy Imperii), the positive law valid for the Russian Empire. Speransky's liberal ideas were subsequently scrutinized and elaborated by Konstantin Kavelin and Boris Chicherin.
Although the revolt was a proscribed topic during Nicholas’ reign, Alexander Herzen placed the profiles of executed Decembrists on the cover of his radical periodical Polar Star. Alexander Pushkin addressed poems to his Decembrist friends; Nikolai Nekrasov, whose father served together with Decembrists in Ukraine, wrote a long poem about the Decembrist wives; and Leo Tolstoy started writing a novel on that liberal movement, which would later evolve into War and Peace. In the Soviet era Yuri Shaporin produced an opera entitled Dekabristi (The Decembrists), about the revolt, with the libretto written by Aleksey Nikolayevich Tolstoy. It premiered at the Bolshoi Theatre on 23 June 1953.

To some extent, the Decembrists were in the tradition of a long line of palace revolutionaries of 1725–1825 who wanted to place their candidate on the throne, but many Decembrists also wanted to implement either classical liberalism or a moderate conservatism contrary to the more Jacobin, centralizing program of Pavel Pestel or the pan-Slavic confederation-advocating revolutionaries of the "Society of United Slavs". The majority of Decembrists were not members of illegal organizations similar to the participants of palace revolutions. Some were members of the Union of Prosperity only, sympathetic to an official, pro-governmental fairly conservative program. But their revolt, unlike previous Romanov palace revolutions, has been considered the beginning of a revolutionary movement. The uprising was the first open breach between the government and reformist elements of the Russian nobility, which would subsequently widen.

References

Sources

 Gabayev, G. S. (1932, in Russian). Soldaty – uchastniki zagovora i vosstaniya dekabristov (Солдаты – участники заговора и восстания декабристов), in: Dekabristy i ih vremya (Декабристы и их время), vol. 4. Moscow: VOPSP.
 Mazour, Anatole (1937). The first Russian revolution, 1825: the Decembrist movement, its origins, development, and significance. Stanford University Press. Reissue: , .
 Nechkina, Militsa (1984, in Russian). Dekabristy (Декабристы). Moscow: Nauka.
 Seton-Watson, Hugh (1988). The Russian empire, 1801–1917. Oxford University Press. , .
 Notes of Prince S.P. Trubetskoy (Saint Petersburg, 1906)

Further reading

 Crankshaw, E. (1976) The Shadow of the Winter Palace: Russia's Drift to Revolution, 1825–1917, New York, Viking Press.
 Eidelman, Natan (1985) Conspiracy against the tsar, Moscow, Progress Publishers, 294 p. (Translation from the Russian by Cynthia Carlile.)
 Figes, Orlando (2002) Natasha's Dance: a Cultural History of Russia, London, .
 Grey, Ian. (1973) "The Decembrists: Russia's First Revolutionaries, 1825" History Today (Sept 1973), Vol. 23 Issue 9, pp 656–663 online.
 Mazour, A.G. (1937) The First Russian Revolution, 1825: The Decembrist movement, its origins, development, and significance, Stanford University Press.
 
 Sherman, Russell & Pearce, Robert (2002) Russia 1815–81, Hodder & Stoughton.
 Trigos, Ludmilla. (2009) The Decembrist myth in Russian culture (Springer)
 Ulam, Adam B. (1981) Russia's Failed Revolutions: From the Decembrists to the Dissidents ch 1.
 Whittock, Michael. "Russia's December Revolution, 1825" History Today (Aug 1957) 7#8 pp530–537.

External links

 Decembrist exile in Irkutsk
 Decembrist exile in Siberia 
 Online Museum of the Decembrist movement 

Conflicts in 1825
19th-century rebellions
 
Politics of the Russian Empire
1825 in the Russian Empire
Rebellions against the Russian Empire
Conspiracies
December 1825 events
Wars of succession involving the states and peoples of Europe
Wars of succession involving the states and peoples of Asia
Nicholas I of Russia
Revolutions during the 1820s